Eupithecia sonora is a moth in the family Geometridae. It is found in Sonora, Mexico, the Gila River Valley, New Mexico, and the Chiricahua Mountains in Arizona.

The length of the forewings is 8–9 mm for males and 8.5–10 mm for females. The forewings are dark smoky brown with a dark brown discal spot. The hindwings are smoky brown.

Etymology
The specific epithet refers to the place name of the general collection locality.

References

Moths described in 2008
sonora
Moths of North America